Stella Díaz Varín (August 11, 1926 in La Serena – June 13, 2006 in Santiago), also known as La Colorina ("The Redhead"), was a Chilean poet of the Generation of '50. Her unprecedented deep and philosophical style, as well as her controversial personality, marked a before and after in Chilean poetry.

Biography 
Stella Díaz Varín was born into a middle-class family. Her mother was a descendant from a highborn family of french origin which had fallen on hard times. Her father was an anarchist clockmaker who fostered in Díaz Varín her political ideals. Their economical situation and her father's ideas, together with her passionate readings, moved her since a very young age to write and publish poems and articles in local newspapers. In a public act in 1946 she read a poem in front of the Chilean president Gabriel Gonzalez Videla which was dedicated to him. After this, the President would help her to settle in Santiago, a desire she had been nourishing since her father's death in 1935.

Díaz Varín moved to Santiago in 1947 to study medicine and psychiatry, despite the opposition of both her mother and older brother. Her interest in psychiatry came from her desire to scrutinize the human brain and therefore understand the dreams of humans.

During her studies she wrote articles and poems for several newspapers: El Siglo, La Opinión (where she met Vicente Huidobro), El Extra (where she reported crimes in low-income sectors of Santiago) and La Hora. The closing of the newspapers in which she worked forced Díaz Varín to abandon her studies, which she never completed.

President González Videla, who had won the elections in 1946 with the support of the Communist Party, passed the Law of Permanent Defense of Democracy (Spanish: Ley de Defensa Permanente de la Democracia, N°8.987) which prohibited the existence of the Communist Party in Chile. Its members, Díaz Varín among them, became persecuted. Based on their mutual aversion toward the government, Díaz Varín, Enrique Lafourcade and Enrique Lihn tattooed a skull in their shoulders, symbolizing a pact to kill González Videla, whom they considered a dictator.

In 1949, the editor Domingo Morales helps Díaz Varín to publish her first book: Reason of my Being (Razón de mi ser). The poems of this volume reflect the vitality and strength of the poet; through suggestive images and an underground language she wrote about death, solitude and recognition of the feminine condition. This poems manifest the intricate relationship between the writer's life and poetical creation.

A fictionalized version of Díaz Varín appears in Alejandro Jodorowsky's autobiographical film Endless Poetry (2016), where she is played by Pamela Flores. Jodorowsky represents her as a Chilean Bukowski and the first punk poetess (probably based on how beat literature has inspired punk and cyberpunk literature).

Works
Reason of my being, 1949
Symphony of fossil man, 1953
Time, as imaginary, 1959
The gifts foreseeable, 1992

References

1926 births
2006 deaths
People from La Serena
20th-century Chilean women writers
20th-century Chilean poets
Chilean women poets